Anatoma weddelliana is a species of minute sea snail, a marine gastropod mollusc or micromollusc in the family Anatomidae.

Description
The height of the shell reaches 5.6 mm.

Distribution
This species occurs in the Weddell Sea, Antarctica

References

  Zelaya D.G. & Geiger D.L. (2007). Species of Scissurellidae and Anatomidae from Sub-Antarctic and Antarctic waters (Gastropopda: Vetigastropoda). Malacologia 49(2):393-443.
  Engl W. (2012) Shells of Antarctica. Hackenheim: Conchbooks. 402 pp.

External links
 To World Register of Marine Species

Anatomidae
Gastropods described in 2007